Allen station is an elevated light rail station on the L Line of the Los Angeles Metro Rail system. It is located in the median of Interstate 210 (Foothill Freeway), above North Allen Avenue, after which the station is named, in Pasadena, California. The light rail station opened on July 26, 2003, as part of the original Gold Line, then known as the "Pasadena Metro Blue Line" project. This station and all the other original and Foothill Extension stations will be part of the A Line upon completion of the Regional Connector project in 2023.

The station is also signed as Allen/College, for the nearby Pasadena City College, which operates shuttles between the station and its campuses.

It is one of the L Line stations near the Rose Parade route on Colorado Boulevard and is used by people coming to see the parade.

This station features an architectural design called Rider's Dream, created by artist Michael Amescua.

Service

Station layout

Hours and frequency

Connections 
, the following connections are available:
 Los Angeles Metro Bus: 
 Pasadena Transit: 10, 40
 Pasadena City College Shuttle

Notable places nearby 
The station is within walking distance of the following notable places:
 California Institute of Technology
 Pasadena City College main campus
 Pasadena Conservatory of Music

References

External links 
 

L Line (Los Angeles Metro) stations
Transportation in Pasadena, California
Railway stations in the United States opened in 2003